Blatačko Lake is a natural lake 21 kilometers to the north-east of Konjic, in Konjic municipality, Bosnia and Herzegovina. The lake is a central feature of the natural & cultural-historical ensemble - cultural landscape - designated as National Monument of Bosnia and Herzegovina.

Location and description

The lake is located in close proximity to Blace village (1,215 m) on a karstic plateau of the Bjelašnica mountain, on the very edge of the Rakitnica canyon practically hanging over it at 1,156 meters a.s.l. It is of rectangular shape, around 500 m long and 140 m wide. During the summer months it is up to 2 meters deep.

National monument
Natural position of the lake itself and surrounding space's rich cultural-historical heritage, with prehistoric grave mounds, medieval necropolises with stećak and nišani tombstones in and around the village of Blace, forming one combined cultural landscape with part of the deep Rakitnica canyon, is designated as a National Monument of Bosnia and Herzegovina.

Cultural-historical heritage
The protected perimeter of the monument consists of number of important sites:
the Blatačko lake and its surrounding landscape with an area of 20 hectares including a part of the Rakitnica canyon,
4 prehistoric grave mounds and medieval necropolis consisting of 15 stećak tombstones at the location called "Kosan-krst",
prehistoric grave mound and medieval necropolis with 12 stećak tombstones at the location called "Viš-stijena",
prehistoric grave mound and medieval necropolis with 3 stećak tombstones at the location called "Babaluša",
medieval necropolis with 8 stećak tombstones at the location called "Kod Čekića",
prehistoric grave mound and 1 isolated medieval stećak at the location called "Komadinov Do",
medieval necropolis with 7 stećak tombstones within active Orthodox cemetery,
necropolis with 9 nišan tombstones since medieval times near "Komadinov Do".

Natural heritage
Species placed under the strict protection: Sesleria juncifolia, Sesleria coerulens, Festuca panciciana, Festuca bosniaca, Senecio bosniacus, Veronica satureoides, Gentiana dinarica, Gentiana symphyandra, Gentianella crispata, Endraianthus serpyllifolius, Saxifraga caryophylla, Minuartia clandestina, Silene pusilla, Alchemilla velebitica, Cerastium dinaricum.

Endemic alpine meadow species: Sesleria juncifolia, Sesleria coerulens, Festuca panciciana, Festuca bosniaca, Senecio bosniacus, Veronica satureioides, Gentiana dinarica, Gentiana symphyandra, Gentianella crispata.

Glacial relicts: Dryas octopetala, Polygonum viviparum, Gentiana kochiana, Nigritella nigra, Potentilla clusiana, Arnica montana, Jasione orbiculata, Achillea lingulata, Lilium bosniacum.

High alpine flora of the alpine pastures, rocky terrain and Rakitnica canyon:
Plants found in the glacial cirques of Bjelašnica belong to the endemic association Amphoricarpion autariati and communities in the limestone canyon of the Rakitnica and on dolomitic soils, with following species of distinctive flora: Edraianthus serpyllifolius, Saxifraga caryophylla, Minuartia clandestina, Silene pusilla, Alchemilla velebitica, Cerastium dinaricum.

Species on limestone soils: Dripis linneana, Arabis alpina, Heracleum balcanicum, Stachys recta.

The ichthyofauna of the Tušilačka river and Rakitnica consists exclusively of salmonids.

Reptiles include the globally endangered meadow viper, Vipera ursini macrops, classified as endangered by IUCN, along with other vipers – V. berus bosniaca, V. amodites – and other snakes including Coronella austriaca, Coluber sp, the legless lizard Anguis fragilis, other lizard species – Lacerta vivipara, L. viridis, L. fragilis, L. Muralis – and frogs Hyla arborea and Rana agilis.

Invertebrates consist 127 recorded species of butterflies and moths (Lepidoptera) and 29 of grasshoppers (Orthoptera). There is also no fewer than 24 species recorded as endangered in Europe.
Invertebrates classed as threatened in Europe, present in the Igman-Bjelašnica-Treskavica-Visočica area (also area proposed for ecological protection as National park):
Threatened: Maculinea nausithous (butterfly), Maculinea teleius (butterfly), Apatura metis (butterfly);
Vulnerable: Dolomedes plantarius (spider), Saga pedo (bush cricket), Hyles hippophaes (moth); 
Rare: Helix pomatia (gastropod - snail), Troglophantes gracilis (spider), Troglophantes similes (spider), Troglophantes spinipes (spider), Parnassius apollo (butterfly), Erebia ottomana (butterfly), Epimyrma ravouxi (ant);
Insufficiently known: Microcondylae compressa (fresh water mussel), Unio elegantus (fresh water mussel), Hirudo medicinalis (leech), Leucorrhinia pectoralis (dragonfly), Myrmeleon formicarius (antlion), Syrichtus tesselum (butterfly), Papilio alexanor (butterfly), Zerynthia polyxena (butterfly), Erebia calcari (butterfly).

Birds include some 110 species, along with birds of prey such as the golden eagle (Aquila chrysaetos) and the short-toed snake eagle (Circaetus gallicus), the peregrine falcon (Falco peregrinus), the common kestrel (Falco tinninculus), the goshawk (Accipiter gentilis), the Eurasian sparrowhawk (Accipiter nisus) and the Levant sparrowhawk (Accipiter brevipes). One species on the 2006 IUCN Red List of Threatened Species, the globally vulnerable corn crake (Crex crex), is found in the area.

Mammals and larger mammals are: chamois (Rupicapra rupicapra balcanica), brown bear (Ursus arctos), the gray wolf (Canis lupus), the roe deer (Capreolus capreolus), wild boar (Sus scrofa), pine marten (Martes martes), which is already becoming much rarer, stoat (Mustela erminea), wild cat (Felis silvestris), lynx (Lynx lynx), and other 60 or more species.

See also
List of lakes in Bosnia and Herzegovina

References

Lakes of Bosnia and Herzegovina
National Monuments of Bosnia and Herzegovina
Upper Neretva